Kai Budde (born 28 October 1979), is a semi-retired professional Magic: The Gathering player, who holds the record for Pro Tour victories, and for a long time held the records for earnings and lifetime Pro Points. His performances earned him the nicknames "The (German) Juggernaut" and "King of the Grand Prix". Kai left the game in late 2004 to focus on his studies, and his appearances in tournaments are less frequent than in earlier years. Budde is widely considered to be one of the all-time greatest Magic: The Gathering players.

He has won five individual Pro Tour titles (no other player has won more than three), and two Team Pro Tour titles (alongside fellow Germans Marco Blume and Dirk Baberowski). Budde also won the 1999 Magic World Championship in Tokyo. His cash winnings in six years of premier Magic: The Gathering tournaments are well over $300,000. He has also been awarded a record four Player of the Year titles: 1999, 2001, 2002, and 2003.

Budde also won the 2001 Magic Invitational tournament in Cape Town. His prize was the rare opportunity to design an actual card; the result was Voidmage Prodigy. In 2007, Kai Budde was inducted into the Pro-Tour Hall of Fame.

Career

Early years
Budde started playing Magic in 1994 when he learned about the game from fellow gamers. As a player from Cologne he quickly became acquainted with more experienced players from the city such as later Pro Tour winner Frank Adler. His rise to professional play coincided with that of Dirk Baberowski, another Magic player who had moved to Cologne. Being at a comparable level of playing, both worked together to qualify for the Pro Tour. Budde succeeded on his second attempt, thus qualifying for the 1997 Pro Tour New York. As he had not yet turned eighteen Kai chose to attend the Junior Division of the tournament, eventually finishing among the best 32. Afterwards, the Junior Pro Tour was discontinued and Budde was automatically qualified for the following Pro Tour in Mainz.

Kai finished 52nd in Mainz and for a while struggled to qualify for another Pro Tour but eventually managed to qualify for the 1998 Pro Tour Chicago. Fellow player and now friend Baberowski had finally managed to qualify for the Pro Tour, too. While Kai finished 19th Baberowski won the whole tournament. After a second place at Grand Prix Birmingham Budde added three Grand Prix titles within six months. The third one in Amsterdam even came by defeating Baberowski in the finals. With these finishes Budde had racked up enough Pro Points to be in contention for the Pro Player of the Year title in the final event of the 1998–99 season. Having not made a Pro Tour Top 8 appearance yet the leader in the Pro Player of the Year race did not consider him to be a threat, though. When Budde advanced to the final of the 1999 World Championship in Tokyo he had already secured the Pro Player of the year race. He added the World Champion title by defeating Mark Le Pine in one of the quickest Pro Tour finals ever.

After adding an 11th-place finish at the next Pro Tour in London the rest of the 1999–2000 season turned out to be disappointing. He was not able to make it beyond the first round in any of the newly introduced Masters events nor did he finish better than Top 64 at any of the succeeding Pro Tours.

Five Pro Tour titles in two years
It took Kai until November 2000 to make another final eight appearance. A third place at Grand Prix Florence was followed by his second Pro Tour win. The 2000 Pro Tour Chicago title made him the third player to win more than one Pro Tour, the other two being Jon Finkel and Tommi Hovi. Winning Pro Tour Barcelona in the same season, Kai managed to surpass Finkel and Hovi to become the first player to win three Pro Tours. In the semi-final at Barcelona Budde had even asked if he could concede to his friend Patrick Mello to make him eligible for the next Masters, but the officials had refused. Finally a 44th-place finish at the World Championship in Toronto sufficed to make Kai the first double Pro Player of the Year.

The 2001–02 season started very well for Kai Budde with consecutive wins at Grand Prix London and Pro Tour New York. For the Team Pro Tour New York Kai had chosen his friends Dirk Baberowski and Marco Blume, despite being able to play with virtually anybody he would have liked. Dirk had retired from the game for some time, but Kai managed to convince him to come along for the Pro Tour. Team "Phoenix Foundation" as they called themselves went on to become the most successful team in the Pro Tour history. Pro Tour New York is also the origin of the saying "Kai doesn't lose on Sunday". Several Pro Players had answered something to that extent when asked who their favorite amongst the final four teams was. Less than two months later Kai added another Pro Tour title, this time in New Orleans. He is still the only player in the game to have won back to back Pro Tours. In between, Budde had also won the Invitational which gave him the chance to create a Magic card of his own design. The card eventually became .

Throughout the season a few more Grand Prix titles followed and eventually he managed another Top 8 appearance at Pro Tour Nice, this time losing in the quarter-final to Bram Snepvangers. Before the final event of the season, the World Championship in Sydney, Kai was already locked in to succeed himself as Pro Tour Player of the Year. Only a week after Nice, Budde won the German Nationals, securing another title he had not won before and thus making the national team. While he finished 44th individually at the World Championship, Kai led the German team with Felix Schneiders, a fellow player from his Cologne days, and Mark Ziegner to the team title.

Phoenix Foundation won the first Pro Tour of the 2002–03 season, giving Kai an early lead in the Pro Player of the Year race. Also this set the three Phoenix Foundation members in the top three spots in lifetime Pro Tour wins until Jon Finkel overtook Blume with his victory in Kuala Lumpur five years later. After a few mediocre finishes through mid-season Kai won his seventh Pro Tour in Chicago, beating some of the most accomplished players such as Jon Finkel, William Jensen, and Nicolai Herzog along the way. Despite making no further Top 8 appearances in the season Kai was able to take his fourth Pro Player of the Year title with a comfortable lead.

Decline
In 2003–04 Phoenix Foundation managed to open with another top 4 appearance, but lost in the semi-final to the eventual winners. Kai managed to make a few more Top 8 appearance at Grand Prixs, among those a victory at the then biggest Magic tournament ever at Madrid, but his performances declined notably. He managed an undefeated first day at Pro Tour Philadelphia in the following season, but was quickly eliminated from the event afterwards. Budde has since been considered to be retired from Pro Play although he has shown up for a Pro Tour from time to time. Eventually he was inducted into the Hall of Fame at the 2007 World Championship in New York. Over the next years he played on the Pro Tour occasionally, but without much success. However, in 2010 Budde made his tenth Pro Tour top 8 in Amsterdam, and in 2011 he made his fifteenth Grand Prix top 8 in Paris. Since Pro Tour Return to Ravnica Budde has been a part of the team currently called 'The Pantheon', alongside players such as Jon Finkel, William Jensen, and Gabriel Nassif. In 2019, he made the Top4 of the Mythic Championship III, a rebranded version of the Pro Tour, which was entirely played on Magic Arena.

Top 8 appearances

Other accomplishments

 Pro Player of the Year 1998–1999
 Pro Player of the Year 2000–2001
 Pro Player of the Year 2001–2002
 Pro Player of the Year 2002–2003
 Magic Hall of Fame class of 2007 vote leader

References

German Magic: The Gathering players
Living people
1979 births
Sportspeople from Cologne
Sportspeople from Hamburg
Players who have won the Magic: The Gathering World Championship